Liam Knight (born 15 January 1995) is an Australian professional rugby league footballer who primarily plays as a  and  forward for the South Sydney Rabbitohs in the NRL.

Knight previously played for the Manly Warringah Sea Eagles and the Canberra Raiders in the National Rugby League.

Background
Knight was born in Alice Springs, Northern Territory, Australia and moved to New South Wales at a young age.

Knight played his junior rugby league for The Entrance Tigers and Berkeley Vale Panthers. He was then signed by the Manly Warringah Sea Eagles.

Playing career

Early career
From 2013 to 2015, Knight played for the Manly Warringah Sea Eagles' NYC team. On 8 July 2015, he played for the New South Wales under-20s team against the Queensland under-20s team.

2016
In 2016, Knight graduated to the Sea Eagles' Intrust Super Premiership NSW team. In March, he re-signed with the Sea Eagles on a 1-year contract. In Round 15 of the 2016 NRL season, he made his NRL debut for the Sea Eagles against the Gold Coast Titans. In September, he was released from the final year of his Sea Eagles contract to take up a 3-year contract with the Sydney Roosters starting in 2017.

2017
In June, Knight was released from his Roosters' contract to join the Canberra Raiders effective immediately on a contract until the end of 2019.

2018
In round 3 of the 2018 NRL season, he made his debut for Canberra in the 19-20 loss to the New Zealand Warriors at Canberra Stadium. In round 15 of the 2018 NRL season against the West Tigers, Knight scored his first NRL try in Canberra's 48-12 win at Campbelltown Stadium.

2019
Knight made his debut for South Sydney in round 1 of the 2019 NRL season against rivals the Sydney Roosters at the Sydney Cricket Ground.  Knight made a total of 23 appearances for Souths in 2019 as the club finished third on the table and qualified for the finals.  Knight played in all three finals games for Souths as the club reached the preliminary final but were defeated by his former club Canberra 16-10 at Canberra Stadium.

2020
In week 2 of the NRL 2020 finals series, Knight played his 50th NRL game scoring a try in a 38-24 victory against Parramatta.
Knight played a total of 19 games for Souths in the 2020 NRL season including all three of the club's
finals matches.

2021
Knight played 11 games for South Sydney in the 2021 NRL season. Knight did not feature in South Sydney's finals campaign or their 2021 NRL Grand Final loss to Penrith.

2022
Knight played eight games for South Sydney in the 2022 NRL season but did not feature in the clubs finals campaign as they reached the preliminary final before losing to Penrith.

Controversy
On 16 March 2016, Knight was charged with high range drink driving and exceeding the speed limit. Police claimed to have clocked him doing 137 kilometres per hour in a 70 kilometre zone. Knight was arrested, before being subjected to a breath test where he returned a blood alcohol reading of 0.176. He was also issued with a licence suspension notice and his licence was immediately confiscated. He was then stood down by the Sea Eagles.

References

External links

 
 

1995 births
Living people
Australian rugby league players
Manly Warringah Sea Eagles players
Canberra Raiders players
Rugby league second-rows
Rugby league props
Rugby league players from the Northern Territory
South Sydney Rabbitohs players